International Journal of Population Data Science, also known as IJPDS, is a peer-reviewed open-access journal publishing original research on issues in population data science and administrative data linkage to advance population study across health, education, environment and other domains. It was established in 2017 in partnership with the International Population Data Linkage Network (IPDLN).

Scope 
The journal publishes articles under four categories of population data science: (1) Data use for population impact; (2) Bringing together and analysing data from multiple sources; (3) Identifying population level insights; and (4) Developing safe, privacy-sensitive and ethical infrastructure to support research.

Abstracting and indexing 
The journal is indexed in the Directory of Open Access Journals, PubMed, MEDLINE, PubMed Central, Europe PMC, Scopus, ResearchGate and WorldCat, among other scientific publication indexes and directories. Based on its CiteScore metric of 1.6 in 2017–2020, the journal ranked in the top tercile out of 109 tracked journals of similar scope.

Contents 
Research published in the journal has found that enhancing public policy relevance of data linkage studies can help ensure social legitimacy. The journal also occasionally publishes themed collections. In 2020, the journal issued a call for papers on the theme "Population data science for COVID-19". Given the unprecedented impacts of the global pandemic, health data researchers identified and published their recommendations for approaches to timely and equitable data sharing for research and analysis.

In 2021, the journal issued a call for papers on the theme "Work designed to influence policy and practice."

Editorial Board 
The journal's Founding Editor-in-Chief is Professor Kerina Jones of Swansea University, UK, and the journal's Deputy Editor is Professor Kim McGrail from the University of Columbia, Canada. Together they lead a panel of 17 international editors.

See also
 International Population Data Linkage Network
 Population Health Research Network (PHRN), Western Australia 
 Administrative Data Research UK (ADR UK)
 Heath Data Research UK (HDR UK)
 Secure Anonymised Information Linkage (SAIL) Databank, Swansea University
 Health Data Research Network Canada
 Population Data BC, British Columbia, Canada
 Actionable Intelligence for Social Policy (AISP), Philadelphia, USA
 ICES (Formally the Institute for Clinical Evaluative Sciences, Ontario, Canada

References

External links
 

Demography journals
Open access journals
Publications established in 2017
English-language journals
Creative Commons Attribution-licensed journals